Paramesosella is a genus of longhorn beetles of the subfamily Lamiinae, containing the following species:

 Paramesosella affinis Breuning, 1970
 Paramesosella alboplagiata Breuning, 1948
 Paramesosella fasciculata Breuning, 1940
 Paramesosella gigantea Breuning, 1948
 Paramesosella maxima Hüdepohl, 1999
 Paramesosella medioalba Breuning, 1956
 Paramesosella plurifasciculata Breuning, 1970
 Paramesosella stheniformis Breuning, 1940
 Paramesosella sthenioides (Breuning, 1938)

References

Pteropliini